Gabriel Rowan Cullaigh (born 8 April 1996) is a British professional racing cyclist, who currently rides for UCI Continental team .

Major results

2012
 1st  Youth race, National Criterium Championships
2013
 2nd Road race, National Junior Road Championships
 2nd Points race, National Junior Track Championships
2014
 1st  Scratch, National Junior Track Championships
 1st Guido Reybrouck Classic
 UEC European Junior Track Championships
2nd  Scratch
2nd  Team pursuit
3rd  Points race
 3rd Madison, National Track Championships (with Mark Stewart)
2015
 1st Stage 1 Peace Race U23
 7th Beaumont Trophy
2016
 3rd Time trial, National Under-23 Road Championships
 3rd Kattekoers
 5th Road race, UEC European Under-23 Road Championships
2017
 8th Grand Prix de la Ville de Lillers
2018
 1st Rutland–Melton CiCLE Classic
 1st Redditch, Tour Series
 Volta ao Alentejo
1st Stages 1 & 6
 3rd Road race, National Under-23 Road Championships
 3rd Gran Premio della Liberazione
 9th Kattekoers
2019
 1st Stage 3 Volta ao Alentejo
 2nd Rutland–Melton CiCLE Classic
2021
 5th Trofeo Alcúdia – Port d'Alcúdia
 7th Clásica de Almería

References

External links

1996 births
Living people
British male cyclists
European Games competitors for Great Britain
Cyclists at the 2019 European Games
People from Holmfirth
21st-century British people